The 2006 Armenian First League season started on 1 May 2006. The last matches were played on 24 October 2006. Pyunik-2 became the league champions, but because they are a reserve team they were unable to promote to the Armenian Premier League. As a result, the second placed team Lernayin Artsakh was given promotion. Due to Banants-2 and Ararat-2 finishing in third and fourth position, the fifth placed team FC Dinamo Yerevan played in the promotion/relegation play-off, which was lost in the end.

Overview
Patani representing the Armenia national under-17 football team and FC Yezerk Noyemberyan are introduced to the league.
Esteghlal-Kotayk-2 are renamed back to Kotayk-2.
FIMA Yerevan change their name to Hay Ari.

League table

Promotion/relegation play-off

See also
 2006 Armenian Premier League
 2006 Armenian Cup

External links
 RSSSF: Armenia 2006 - Second Level

 

Armenian First League seasons
2
Armenia
Armenia